The Weight of Oceans is the third album by Swedish melodic death metal band In Mourning,  released on April 18, 2012. The album entered the Finnish charts at number 40.

Track listing

Credits

Musicians 
 Tobias Netzell – vocals, guitars
 Björn Pettersson – guitars, vocals
 Tim Nedergård – guitars
 Christian Netzell – drums
 Pierre Stam – bass

References 

2012 albums
In Mourning (band) albums
Spinefarm Records albums